Chris Olley is a Nottingham based musician and photographer. He was the lead singer and guitarist for Six By Seven and also the band's main creative influence. He studied art at Wakefield College (1990–91) and gained a BA (Hons) in photography at Nottingham Trent University (1991–94). It was at his time at University that Olley met Sam Hempton and together they formed six.byseven.

Olley and Chris Davis were the only constant members in the different line-ups of Six By Seven over the years. Although born in England, Olley spent much of his early years in Germany, a fact alluded to on Six By Seven's first single "European Me". Consequently, some Six By Seven releases have featured tracks sung entirely in German, most notably the B-Side "Helden", a cover of David Bowie's song "Heroes".

Olley also released music as part of his Twelve project during his time with six.byseven and after.

In 2006 and 2008, Olley toured with Julian Cope as merchandise man and roadie. Chris Olley at this time also recorded much of the album 'You Got A problem With Me' and is also credited with playing synthesizer on the album. Olley also recorded the album 'The Black Sheep' as well as contributing backing vocals and guitar. During this time Olley also edited and mastered Brain Donor as well as co writing and recording and providing German translations for the album "Vernichte Die Gotter" by a fictional Dutch duo named Kabalist. Olley appeared under the name Hugo De Klay and Julian Cope played synth and did vocals under his alias Ron Boots. Olley also played Wurlitzer and Hammond organ in Julian Copes band at the ATP show in Minehead 2007.

In 2006, Cope's Jehovahkill album was re-released as a deluxe edition with an extra CD. Olley is acknowledged for the editing and tape transfer of disc 2 (in his own SNSM studios).

2009 saw the release of a debut solo album entitled A Streetcar Named Disaster and several other EP's including "East Of Edale" and "Who's Afraid Of Virginia Wade" and "The Grapes of Hyman Roth" through his website and Cargo Records.

In late 2007 Olley returned to his photography once more and undertook a project to photograph every football stadium in the first 4 leagues on a 250cc motorbike. The trip ended at the end of the summer of 2010 with an exhibition of all 92 images in Derby Museum's Salt Mill Gallery.

More recently his 92 Stadiums project was shown in Gdańsk during the European Championships in Poland.

Discography
 A Streetcar Named Disaster
 A Streetcar Named Disaster (Bonus Disc)
 East Of Edale (website only EP)
 Who's Afraid Of Virginia Wade (website only EP)
 Six 8 Track Demo's (website only EP)
 The Grapes Of Hyman Roth (website only EP)
 A Dog Is For Christmas (website only album) DELETED
 The Adventures Of Baron Munchausen By Proxy (Compilation Japanese Import)
 Sign On You Crazy Diamond (Internet only Album)
 The Blackest Soul
 Crap On A Hot Tin Roof (Box Set)
 Love And Peace And Sympathy

References

External links
 Chris Olley's Blog and six.byseven archive
 Chris Olley's photography
 Chris Olley photographs every league ground in the country
 Nerve magazine interview 2010
 A Streetcar Named Disaster Interview 2010
 Interview with Chris Olley 2006

Living people
Musicians from Nottinghamshire
Year of birth missing (living people)